Maria Igorevna Shkanova (Maryja Iharaŭna Škanava; born 18 October 1989) is an alpine skier from Belarus.  She competed for Belarus at the 2010 Winter Olympics.  Her best result was a 33rd place in the super-G. She won a bronze medal in the combined event at the 2013 Winter Universiade.

References

External links
 
 

1989 births
Belarusian female alpine skiers
Alpine skiers at the 2010 Winter Olympics
Alpine skiers at the 2014 Winter Olympics
Alpine skiers at the 2018 Winter Olympics
Alpine skiers at the 2022 Winter Olympics
Olympic alpine skiers of Belarus
Universiade medalists in alpine skiing
Living people
Universiade silver medalists for Belarus
Universiade bronze medalists for Belarus
Competitors at the 2013 Winter Universiade
Competitors at the 2015 Winter Universiade
Competitors at the 2017 Winter Universiade